Safo may refer to:

Balcha Safo (1863–1936), Ethiopian general
Safo, Mali, a town and commune in the Koulikoro Region of Mali
Safo, Niger, a village and rural commune in Niger
Safo, historia de una pasión, a 1943 Argentine romantic drama film
Sarah Adwoa Safo, a Ghanaian lawyer and politician
Safo'63, ("Love and Sex (Sappho '63)"), a 1964 Mexican film

See also
SAFO, an information tool in the aviation community
Sappho, ancient Greek poet